Piyush Sadhu (20 May 1977 – 23 February 2014) was an Indian cricketer. He played two first-class matches for Vidarbha in 1997/98. He died of multiple organ failure following severe jaundice.

References

External links
 

1977 births
2014 deaths
Indian cricketers
Vidarbha cricketers
Cricketers from Nagpur
Deaths from multiple organ failure